Rebecca Jayne Callard (born 3 June 1975) is an English actress and writer.

Early life 
Callard was born Rebecca Jayne Atkinson, the only surviving child from her mother Beverley Callard's first marriage to Paul Atkinson. Her parents divorced in 1978, and her mother remarried three times, to David Sowden, Steven Callard, and Jon McEwan. As a young actor, Rebecca was credited in early roles as Rebecca Sowden; she changed her stage name to Rebecca Callard following her mother's 1989 marriage to Steven Callard.

As a child, Callard lived on Dawsons Corner in Pudsey, Leeds in West Yorkshire. She attended Intake High School in Bramley, where she was friends with future Spice Girl Melanie Brown and actress Angela Griffin.

Callard married actor Gideon Turner in 2001 and they have two children; the couple separated in 2016.

Career 
Callard's television roles have included Fiona Brett in Children's Ward, Arrietty Clock in The Borrowers and The Return of the Borrowers, Laura Hutchings in Sunburn, chambermaid Kate Morris in The Grand, and Harriet Marsh in Plotlands. She was also a regular cast member in the BBC Radio 4 comedy series Smelling of Roses, and performed the voice of Tamar in the claymation film The Miracle Maker: The Story of Jesus.

Callard appeared on stage as Juliet at the age of eighteen in Romeo and Juliet, directed by Judi Dench. She played Celia in the UK and US tour of a production of Shakespeare's As You Like It, Rosalind being played by Rebecca Hall. After a four-year break, she returned in 2009 with a production of another Shakespeare play Macbeth at the Royal Exchange Theatre, Manchester, and in a guest-star role in an episode of the television series Robin Hood. In 2011 she played the part of Ruth Walsh in the drama soap Coronation Street.

In 2012, she played Ruth Pulis in the BBC crime drama series Blackout. In 2013 she played Sarah in The Accrington Pals at the Royal Exchange and appeared in the feature film Orthodox also starring Stephen Graham and Michael Smiley.

In 2015, Callard played Grace Wells in the BBC1 series Ordinary Lies. She also played a mechanic, Toni, in the BBC4 comedy Detectorists, appearing in the 2015 Christmas special, series 3 (2017) and the 2022 Christmas special.

In February 2016, she appeared in the BBC drama series Moving On. After appearing in the 2017 ITV drama series, Fearless, she claimed she was relieved not to have any scenes with its star, Michael Gambon, because she and her younger son, George, are such Harry Potter fans that she would have been tempted to "hound him with questions".

In 2017, she won a commendation from The Bruntwood Prize for her first play, A Bit of Light. Callard wrote two episodes of series 2 of Breeders for Sky and FX. She is now writing on series 3. The screen adaptation of her play (which Callard also wrote) has completed filming, starring Anna Paquin, Ray Winstone, Pippa Bennett-Warner and Youssef Kerkour. The film was directed by Stephen Moyer, who starred alongside Callard in series 2 of The Grand.

References

External links 
 

1975 births
Living people
Actors from Dewsbury
Actresses from Yorkshire
English stage actresses
English television actresses
English women dramatists and playwrights
20th-century English actresses
21st-century English actresses
21st-century British dramatists and playwrights
21st-century English women writers
Writers from Yorkshire